Events from the year 2000 in Macau, China.

Incumbents
 Chief Executive - Edmund Ho
 President of the Legislative Assembly - Susana Chou

Events

January
 18 January - The establishment of Liaison Office of the Central People's Government in the Macao Special Administrative Region.

May
 28 May - 2000 Hong Kong–Macau Interport.

References

 
Years of the 20th century in Macau
Macau
Macau
2000s in Macau